Tambohorn or Pizzo Tambo  (Swiss names) or Pizzo Tambò  (used in Italy) is a mountain located at the eastern extremity of the Lepontine Alps on the Swiss-Italian border. The mountain lies on the German-Italian language border, west of the Splügen Pass which divides the Western Alps from the Eastern Alps.

Reaching a height of 3,279 metres, it is the highest peak in the Mesolcina sub-chain which, starting from the Lugano Prealps northwards, ends near the Splügen Pass on the boundary between Lombardy (northern Italy) and the Graubünden canton of Switzerland.

The Tambo is composed mostly of metamorphic rock such as gneiss, mica-schist and phyllite, with a small layer of dolomite just under the peak. It includes three small glaciers, the severally shrunk Tambogletscher on the northeast flank and the Ghiacciaio del Tambo on the west flank, both on the Swiss side, and the by now larger Vedretta della Spianata (3,000-2,740 m) on the southeast side in Italy. Southwards the massif continues with a series of smaller peaks (the highest being the Pizzo Zoccone) before joining the Pizzo Ferré.

Pizzo Tamborello (2,669 m) is the name of the eastern shoulder overlooking the Splügen Pass.

See also
List of most isolated mountains of Switzerland

References

External links

Pizzo Tambo on Summitpost
Pizzo Tambo on Hikr

Alpine three-thousanders
International mountains of Europe
Italy–Switzerland border
Lepontine Alps
Rheinwald
Mesocco
Mountains of Graubünden
Mountains of Lombardy
Mountains of Switzerland
Mountains of the Alps